This is a list of Australian One-day International cricketers. A One Day International, or an ODI, is an international cricket match between two representative teams, each one having ODI status, as determined by the International Cricket Council (ICC). An ODI differs from Test matches in that the number of overs per team is limited, and that each team has only one innings. The list is arranged in the order in which each player earned his first ODI cap. Where more than one player earned his first ODI cap in the same match, those players are listed alphabetically by surname.

Key

General
*: an innings that ended not out
Mat: number of matches played
Batting
Inn: number of innings
NO: number of times an innings ends not out
Runs: number of runs scored by batsman/off bowler's bowling
HS: highest score
Avg: batting average
100/50: number of centuries and half-centuries scored

Bowling
Balls: number of balls bowled
Mdn: number of maiden overs (overs off which no runs were scored)
Wkt: number of wickets taken
BB: best bowling figures
Avg: bowling average
5wI: number of times 5 wickets were taken in an innings
Fielding
Ca: number of catches taken
St: number of stumpings made

Players
Statistics are correct as of 22 November 2022

Captains

Shirt number history

See also
List of Australian Test cricketers
List of Australian Twenty20 International cricketers
List of Australia One Day International cricket records

References and notes

External links
Searchable database of International Cricketers (filtered by country) (Howstat)
List of Australia ODI Caps and debuts (Cricinfo)
ODI/Twenty20 Shirt Numbers
Cricket Australia Shirt Numbers

 
ODI cricketers
Australia